Halpin is an Irish surname. It is an Anglicized form of the Gaelic patronymic Ó hAlpín, meaning 'descendant of Alpin'. Other Anglicized versions of the surname include Halfpenny and Halpenny, and these variants were often used interchangeably prior to widespread literacy in Ireland. For example, the registers of St Peter's Catholic Church, Drogheda, Louth record the variations Halpin, Halfpenny, and Halpenny used throughout the 18th and 19th centuries for demonstrably related individuals.

Notable people with the surname include:

Anita Halpin (born 1944), British politician
Hal Halpin, American computer game executive & entrepreneur
Jim Halpin (1863–1893), English baseball player
John Halpin (born 1961), Scottish football player
Luke Halpin (born 1947), American actor
Marjorie Halpin (1937–2000), U.S.-Canadian anthropologist
Patrick G. Halpin, American executive & talk show host
Robert Halpin (1836–1894), Irish sea captain
Scot Halpin, American drummer
Terry Halpin, Australian professor
Troy Halpin (born 1973), Australian football player

See also
Halpin-Tsai model